Digital Data Exchange (DDEX) is an international standards-setting organization that was formed in 2006 to develop standards that enable companies to communicate information along the digital supply chain more efficiently by:

 Developing standard message and file formats (XML or flat-file)
 Developing choreographies for specific business transactions
 Developing communication protocols (SFTP or based on web services)
 Working with industry bodies to create a more efficient supply chain.

DDEX currently focuses on the music industry and has 3 types of membership: charter, full and associate members, with about 100 members.

Business transactions addressed 
 
DDEX's standards address a series of business transactions:
 Release deliveries
 Sales/usage reporting
 Communication with and amongst Music Licensing Companies
 Licensing of musical works
 Collection of information on sound recordings and musical works in the recording studio

Using DDEX standards
All DDEX standards are available from the DDEX Knowledge Base, with complete documentation. DDEX has also created a series of free introductory videos.

Implementers that want to use any of the DDEX standards are required to take out a software licence. This licence is a royalty-free click wrap licence that grants implementers access to the intellectual property embedded in the DDEX standards.

References

External links
 DDEX Homepage

Music industry
Entertainment industry
Standards organizations in the United States
Organizations established in 2006